Julian John Thurstan Gough (born 1974) is a Group Leader in the Laboratory of Molecular Biology (LMB) of the Medical Research Council (MRC). He was previously a professor of bioinformatics at the University of Bristol.

Education
Gough was educated at The Perse School in Cambridge and the University of Bristol where he was awarded a joint honours degree in Mathematics and Physics in 1998. He went on to complete his PhD in the Laboratory of Molecular Biology (LMB) supervised by Cyrus Chothia on genome analysis and protein structure as a postgraduate student of Sidney Sussex College, Cambridge, graduating in 2001.

Career and research
Following his PhD, Gough completed postdoctoral research at the LMB and Stanford University, with Michael Levitt. Subsequently, he was a scientist at RIKEN in Tokyo before being appointed a member of faculty at the University of Bristol, where he has worked since 2007. He has also been a visiting scientist at the Pasteur Institute in Paris and an associate professor at Tokyo Medical and Dental University.

Gough's research interests are in bioinformatics, computational biology, molecular biology, genomics which has led to the creation of the Superfamily database of Hidden Markov models (HMMs) representing all proteins of known structure. His research has been published in leading peer reviewed scientific journals including Nature, Science, Cell, Nucleic Acids Research, PNAS, the Biochemical Journal, the Journal of Molecular Biology, Genome Research, Bioinformatics, PLOS Genetics, Nature Genetics and the Journal of Bacteriology.

Gough's research has been funded by the Biotechnology and Biological Sciences Research Council (BBSRC), the Engineering and Physical Sciences Research Council (EPSRC), the Natural Environment Research Council (NERC), the European Union (EU) Seventh Research Framework Programme (FP7), the Japan Society for the Promotion of Science (JSPS) and the Royal Society of London.

His former doctoral students and postdocs include Ralph Pethica, Owen Rackham, Hashem Shihab, Matt Oates, and Dimitrios Vavoulis.

References

People educated at The Perse School
British bioinformaticians
Alumni of the University of Bristol
Alumni of Sidney Sussex College, Cambridge
Living people
1974 births